Vasudeva may refer to:

 Vasudeva Anakadundubhi, the character from Mahabharata, father of Vāsudeva-Krishna
 Vāsudeva-Krishna
 Any of the following Kushana kings
 Vasudeva I
 Vasudeva II
 Vasudeva III
 Vasudeva IV
 Vasudeva Kanva
 Vasudeva (Chahamana dynasty)
 Vasudeva (book)